The Prisoner of Zenda is a 1913 silent film adaptation of a play by Edward E. Rice, which was in turn based on the 1894 Anthony Hope novel of the same name. It was directed by Edwin S. Porter and Hugh Ford, and starred stage actor James K. Hackett, Beatrice Beckley and David Torrence.

In 1913, Adolph Zukor lured Hackett from the stage to star in a role which Hackett had played in the theater numerous times. Since feature films were in their infancy, Hackett was at first reluctant to take the part, so Zukor tried to convince Hackett in person; as Neal Gabler writes, "When Hackett came to visit Zukor, he was the very picture of the faded matinee idol. He wore a fur-collared coat with frayed sleeves and carried a gold-headed cane".

According to silentera.com, the Library of Congress possesses two paper positive prints, and the International Museum of Photography and Film at George Eastman House also has a partial positive print.

Plot summary

Cast
 James K. Hackett as Rudolf Rassendyll / King Rudolf of Ruritania
 Beatrice Beckley as Princess Flavia
 David Torrence as Michael, Duke of Strelsau
 Fraser Coalter as Colonel Sapt (as Frazer Coulter)
 William R. Randall as Fritz von Tarlenheim (as C. R. Randall)
 Walter Hale as Rupert of Hentzau
 Frank Shannon as Detchard
 Minna Gale as Antoinette de Mauban (as Mina Gale Haines)
 Charles Green as Johann
 Tom Callahan as Josef
 Sidney Barrington as Marshal Strakencz

See also
 List of Paramount Pictures films
 The House That Shadows Built, a 1931 Paramount promotional compilation, includes an excerpt from this film.

References

External links
 
 
 
 
 The Prisoner of Zenda (1913) at Silent Era
  The American Film Institute(Wayback)
 lantern slide(archived)
  poster(Wayback Machine)

1913 films
1910s adventure drama films
American adventure drama films
American romantic drama films
American silent feature films
American black-and-white films
American films based on plays
Films based on The Prisoner of Zenda
Films directed by Edwin S. Porter
Films directed by Hugh Ford
Films set in the 19th century
Films set in Europe
Paramount Pictures films
1913 romantic drama films
1910s American films
Silent romantic drama films
Silent adventure films
Silent American drama films